Katherine Marie "Kate" Menendez (born 1971) is an American attorney serving as a United States district judge of the United States District Court for the District of Minnesota. She served as a magistrate judge of the same court.

Early life and education 

Menendez was born in Emporia, Kansas. She earned a Bachelor of Arts degree from the University of Chicago in 1993 and a Juris Doctor from the New York University School of Law in 1997.

Career 

From 1996 to 1997, Menendez served as a law clerk for Judge Samuel James Ervin III of the United States Court of Appeals for the Fourth Circuit. She became an assistant federal defender in 1999 and served in the Office of the Federal Public Defender for the District of Minnesota until 2016.

United States magistrate judge 

In March 2016, she was selected as a United States magistrate judge to replace retiring Judge Jeffrey J. Keyes. She was sworn in on April 28, 2016. Her service as a magistrate terminated upon her elevation as a district court judge.

District court service 

On September 8, 2021, President Joe Biden announced his intent to nominate Menendez to serve as a United States district judge of the United States District Court for the District of Minnesota. On September 20, 2021, her nomination was sent to the Senate. President Biden nominated Menendez to the seat vacated by Judge Joan N. Ericksen, who assumed senior status on October 15, 2019. On November 3, 2021, a hearing on her nomination was held before the Senate Judiciary Committee. On December 2, 2021, her nomination was reported out of committee by a 15–7 vote. On December 17, 2021, the United States Senate invoked cloture on her nomination by a 49–21 vote. On December 18, 2021, her nomination was confirmed by a 49–21 vote. She received her judicial commission on December 21, 2021.

References

External links 

1971 births
Living people
20th-century American women lawyers
20th-century American lawyers
21st-century American judges
21st-century American women lawyers
21st-century American lawyers
21st-century American women judges
Judges of the United States District Court for the District of Minnesota
Minnesota lawyers
New York University School of Law alumni
People from Emporia, Kansas
Public defenders
United States district court judges appointed by Joe Biden
United States magistrate judges
University of Chicago alumni